The May Bumps 2007 were a set of rowing races held at Cambridge University from Wednesday 13 June 2007 to Saturday 16 June 2007. The races were run as a bumps race and were the 116th set of races in the series of May Bumps which have been held annually in mid-June in this form since 1887. In 2007, a total of 168 crews took part (93 men's crews and 75 women's crews), with around 1500 participants in total.

Head of the River crews 

  men started from head station, and rowed-over to retain the headship for the 9th time since 1998, and 6th consecutive year.

  women bumped  on the first day regain the headship they lost in 2006.

Highest 2nd VIIIs 

  bumped  on the 1st day to regain the highest 2nd VIII place that they lost in 2006.

  were the highest 2nd women's VIII at the start of the week, and managed to get into the first division - the first time that any women's 2nd VIII has achieved this since the women's Mays were rowed in eights in 1990.

Links to races in other years

Bumps Charts 

Below are the bumps charts all 6 men's and all 5 women's divisions, with the men's event on the left and women's event on the right. The bumps chart represents the progress of every crew over all four days of the racing. To follow the progress of any particular crew, simply find the crew's name on the left side of the chart and follow the line to the end-of-the-week finishing position on the right of the chart.

Note that this chart may not be displayed correctly if you are using a large font size on your browser. A simple way to check is to see that the first horizontal bold line, marking the boundary between divisions, lies between positions 17 and 18.

 Addenbrooke's men were meant to start at 78th, but were sent home without rowing for incompetence.

The Getting-on Race 

The Getting-on Race (GoR) allows a number of crews which did not already have a place from last year's races to compete for the right to race this year. Up to ten crews are removed from the bottom of last year's finishing order, who must then race alongside new entrants to decide which crews gain a place (with one bumps place per 3 crews competing, subject to the maximum of 10 available places).

The 2007 May Bumps Getting-on Race took place on 8 June 2007.

Successful crews 

The successful crews, which competed in the bumps, are (displayed in alphabetical order);

Men

Women

References 

 CUCBC - the organisation that runs the bumps
 1st & 3rd Trinity Boat Club - instant results service
 Cambridge University Radio (CUR1350) - live commentary, instant results, downloadable MP3s of race commentary

May Bumps results
May Bumps
May Bumps
May Bumps